Lukáš Rosol and Igor Zelenay were the defending champions but Rosol decided not to participate.
Zelenay played alongside Jonathan Marray.
Johan Brunström and Dick Norman won the title, defeating Marray and Zelenay 6–4, 7–5 in the final.

Seeds

Draw

Draw

References
 Main Draw

Open Barletta Trofeo Dimiccoli and Boraccino - Doubles
2012 Doubles